Navaygan (also Romanized as Navāygān; also known as Nūdāyejān and Nūdāyjān) is a village in Qaleh Biyaban Rural District, in the Central District of Darab County, Fars Province, Iran. At the 2006 census, its population was 1,712, in 512 families.

References 

Populated places in Darab County